Eumecichthys fiski, the unicorn crestfish or unicornfish, is a very rare, little-known species of crestfish in the family Lophotidae, and the only member of the genus Eumecichthys. It likely has a worldwide distribution, having been first discovered offshore of Kalk Bay, South Africa, and subsequently reported from the Sea of Japan, southwest Florida, Clarion Island off Mexico, Hawaii, and India. A report from the Bering Sea may have been in error. It is found in the bathypelagic zone, at a depth of around 1,000 m (3,300 ft).

This fish has ribbon-like body measuring up to 150 cm (59 in) in length. Its common name comes from a horn-like supraoccipital process projecting forward of its eyes. The upper jaw is protrusible, and the jaws contain small conical teeth. The dorsal fin runs along the entire length of the body and contains 310-392 soft rays; the first three to five dorsal rays at the tip of the projecting ridge are elongated into a pennant. The pectoral fins contain 13-15 rays; the pelvic fins are absent. The anal fin contains five to 9 rays and in adults is split lengthwise to form two rows of nubbins. The caudal fin contains 12-13 rays, with the bottommost ray enlarged and bony. The coloration is silvery with 24-60 dark subvertical bands. The dorsal and caudal fins are crimson.

Eumenichthys is one of three lampriform genera known to possess ink tubes, allowing them to expel a black fluid from their cloacae as a defense against predators. The ink tube is derived from a primitive gut and runs above and parallel to the intestine. A known predator of the unicorn crestfish is the longnose lancetfish (Alepisaurus ferox); a lancetfish 73 cm (29 in) long has been found that had swallowed a unicorn crestfish 55 cm (22 in) long.

References

Lophotidae
Monotypic ray-finned fish genera
Fish described in 1890